Travis Kirschke (born September 6, 1974) is a former American football defensive end. He was originally signed by the Detroit Lions as an undrafted free agent in 1997. He played college football at UCLA.

He also played for the San Francisco 49ers and the Pittsburgh Steelers.

High school years
Travis grew up in Yorba Linda, California and attended Esperanza High School. He was named a California High School player of the year his Senior season and also won the Glenn Davis Award for the best high school player in the Los Angeles area.

College career
Kirschke played college football at UCLA where he made 104 tackles and 6.5 sacks.

Professional career

Detroit Lions
Kirschke was selected by the Detroit Lions as an undrafted free agent in 1997. In his rookie season he played in three games making his NFL debut on August 31 against the Atlanta Falcons. He finished the season with one tackle. In 1998, he spent the majority of the season on the injured reserve list and did not get any playing time. The following year, he played a far more active role in the Lions starting line up with seven starts and 15 appearances. He finished the campaign with 20 tackles and two sacks. In 2000, he played in 13 games recording 13 tackles and 0.5 sacks. In 2001, his fifth season with the Lions, he played in all 16 games making 20 tackles. In his final year with the Lions he made 15 appearances and 19 tackles.

San Francisco 49ers
Kirschke signed for the San Francisco 49ers before the start of the 2003 season. In his only year for the franchise he started in 15 out of 16 games and recorded 43 tackles and 1.5 sacks.

Pittsburgh Steelers
Kirschke signed with the Pittsburgh Steelers as an unrestricted free agent on March 11, 2004. In his first season with the team he played in all 16 games and finished the season with 12 tackles and one sack. In 2005, he was part of the Steelers team who won Super Bowl XL and finished the year 13 tackles and one sack. The following year, he made eight tackles and equaled his career-high total of two sacks. In 2007, he finished the campaign with 26 tackles and two sacks.
In 2008, as part of the NFL's best defense, Travis had a career-high 46 tackles and 2 sacks, 3 more tackles than he had as a starter for the 49ers.

Personal life
Kirschke is married to Amy and has one daughter, Ella, who is a member of the UCLA swim team, and two sons, Gabe and Blake. He is currently an assistant football coach at Valor Christian High School in Highlands Ranch, Colorado.

References

External links
Pittsburgh Steelers bio

1974 births
Living people
American football defensive tackles
Detroit Lions players
Pittsburgh Steelers players
Players of American football from Anaheim, California
San Francisco 49ers players
Sportspeople from Fullerton, California
UCLA Bruins football players
Ed Block Courage Award recipients